Waihirere is a settlement and rural area in the Gisborne District of New Zealand's North Island. It is located 16 kilometres inland from the coastal city of Gisborne.

The settlement is a stronghold for kapa haka, and is where prominent performer Louise Kingi grew up and learned her skills from elders.

The Rhythm and Vines music festival is located in nearby Waimata Valley.

Marae

Parihimanihi Marae and Te Poho o Māhaki meeting house is a meeting place of the hapū of Ngāi Tūketenui and Ngāti Wahia, from the iwi of Te Aitanga-a-Māhaki.

Hangi Pants, a short film about a conflict at a tangi at the marae, was released in 2020.

In October 2020, the Government committed $102,771 from the Provincial Growth Fund to upgrade Parihimanihi Marae, and create three jobs.

Parks

Waiherere Domain is a public reserve owned and operated by Gisborne District Council, which features a playground, cycleway, dog walking area and picnic area, which is also used for jet skiing and kite surfing.

References

Populated places in the Gisborne District